PPHE Hotel Group Limited, formerly Park Plaza Hotels Europe, is an international hospitality real estate group. It is listed on the London Stock Exchange.

History
The company was established by Eli Papouchado, an Israeli property developer, in 1989.

It was floated on the Alternative Investment Market in 2007 and it signed a contract to open 20 hotels in Russia in 2008.

In 2010, it opened a 1,019-bedroom Park Plaza Hotel at Westminster Bridge in London and, in 2013, it opened a 107-bedroom art’otel branded hotel in Amsterdam.

In 2016 the company announced its intention to develop the art'otel London Battersea Powerstation and the art'otel London Hoxton.

Operations
The majority of the group’s hotels operate under the Park Plaza Hotels & Resorts brand (part of Radisson Hotel Group), over which the Group has exclusive rights in countries in Europe and the middle east.

References

External links
 

 
Hotel and leisure companies of the United Kingdom
Companies of Guernsey
Companies listed on the London Stock Exchange